Fort St. John/Tompkins Mile 54 Airport  was located  northwest of Fort St. John, British Columbia, Canada. It is now abandoned.

See also
Fort St. John Airport
Fort St. John (Charlie Lake) Water Aerodrome

References

Defunct airports in British Columbia
Fort Saint John